Naked Science is an American documentary television series that premiered in 2004 on the National Geographic Channel and ran through November 2011. The program featured various subjects related to science and technology. Some of the views expressed might be considered fringe or pseudo-science, and some of the scientists may present opinions which have not been properly peer-reviewed or are not widely accepted within their scientific communities.

Episodes

References

External links

National Geographic (American TV channel) original programming
2000s American documentary television series
2010s American documentary television series
2004 American television series debuts